Chrysozephyrus jakamensis, the jakama hairstreak, is a small butterfly found in India that belongs to the lycaenids or blues family.

Taxonomy
The butterfly was previously classified as Thecla jakamensis Tytler.

Range
The butterfly occurs in India from Nagaland to Manipur.

Status
In 1932 William Harry Evans described the species as rare.

See also
List of butterflies of India (Lycaenidae)

Cited references

References
  
 
 
 
 

Chrysozephyrus
Butterflies of Asia